This is a list of fire departments in the Philippines.

Fire departments in the Philippines (Government-control)

Bureau of Fire Protection 
Davao City Central 911 - Fire Auxiliary Service
 Freeport Area of Bataan - Fire and Rescue
Clark Development Corporations - Public Safety Department
 Camp John Hay Fire Department
 Manila International Airport Authority - Fire and Rescue
 Subic Bay Metropolitan Authority - Fire Department

See also
 Department of the Interior and Local Government

References

 
Philippines